Christoffel Hooijkaas (6 January 1861 – 15 October 1926) was a Dutch sailor who competed in the 1900 Summer Olympics in Meulan, France. With helmsman Henri Smulders and fellow crew Arie van der Velden, Hooijkaas took the silver in the 1st race and the 4th place in the second race of the 3 to 10 ton.

References

External links

 
 
 

1861 births
1926 deaths
Dutch male sailors (sport)
Sportspeople from Rotterdam
Sailors at the 1900 Summer Olympics – 3 to 10 ton
Olympic sailors of the Netherlands

Olympic silver medalists for the Netherlands
Olympic medalists in sailing
Sailors at the 1900 Summer Olympics – Open class